Lawrence Goldman  (born 17 June 1957) is an English historian and the former director of the Institute of Historical Research. A former editor of the Oxford Dictionary of National Biography, he has a PhD from the University of Cambridge. He is a fellow of the Royal Historical Society.

Biography
Born in London, he read history at Jesus College, Cambridge (1976–1979) as an undergraduate. Upon graduation he received a Harkness Fellowship, which enabled him to study history of slavery and American Civil War at Yale University for a year with Ed Morgan, David Montgomery and David Brion Davis. He returned to Cambridge to undertake research in Victorian social science and social policy, and in 1982 he was elected a junior research fellow at Trinity College. In 1985, he moved to Oxford as university lecturer in the Department for Continuing Education. He continues to teach regular adult classes and is president of the Thames and Solent district of the Workers' Educational Association. In 1990, he was appointed to a Fellowship at St Peter's College, where he has also served as admissions tutor and senior dean.

During the academic year 2000–01, he was the university assessor, a senior administrator responsible for student welfare. He has served as chairman of examiners for the Final Honour School of Modern History.

On 1 October 2004, Goldman was appointed editor of the Oxford Dictionary of National Biography, published by Oxford University Press, succeeding Brian Harrison. The appointment was for ten years.

Goldman was the director of the University of London's Institute of Historical Research from 2014 to 2017.

Selected bibliography

Author

"Exceptionalism and Internationalism: The Origins of American Social Science Reconsidered", The Journal of Historical Sociology Vol. 11, 1 (1998) pp. 1–36

"Education as Politics: University Adult Education in England since 1870", Oxford Review of Education Vol. 25, nos. 1&2 (1999) pp. 89–101
"Republicanism, Radicalism and Sectionalism: Land Reform and the Languages of American Working Men 1820–1860", in Articulating America: Fashioning a National Political Culture in Early America, 1750–1850, ed. Rebecca Starr (Lanham, Maryland: Rowman & Littlefield, 2001) pp. 177–233
Science, Reform and Politics in Victorian Britain:  The Social Science Association 1857-1886 (CUP, 2002)
"Civil Society in Nineteenth-century Britain and Germany: J. M. Ludlow, Lujo Brentano and the Labour Question", in Civil Society in British History: Ideas, Identities, Institutions, ed. Jose Harris (Oxford: Oxford University Press, 2003) pp. 97–113
From art to politics: John Ruskin and William Morris (London: William Morris Society, 2005)

Editor
 The blind Victorian: Henry Fawcett and British liberalism (Cambridge: Cambridge University Press, 1989)
 (With Peter Ghosh) Politics and culture in Victorian Britain: essays in memory of Colin Matthew (Oxford: Oxford University Press, 2006)

Articles in Oxford Dictionary of National Biography
 Sir Walter Frederick Crofton (1815–1897)
 Queen Elizabeth the Queen Mother (1900–2002)
 Henry Fawcett (1833–1884)
 George Woodyatt Hastings (1825–1917)
 Sir John Arthur Ransome Marriott (1859–1945)
 Richard Henry Tawney, (1880–1962)

References

1957 births
Living people
Alumni of Jesus College, Cambridge
Yale University alumni
Fellows of Trinity College, Cambridge
Fellows of St Peter's College, Oxford
Harkness Fellows
Historians of the United States
Historians of the British Isles
Dictionary of National Biography
Oxford University Press people
British book editors
Fellows of the Royal Historical Society